This is a list of professional wrestlers and personalities that performed in World Championship Wrestling from 1988 to 2001. They are listed in alphabetical order of their real name. Before World Championship Wrestling was formed, Jim Crockett Promotions existed. For alumni of that promotion, see List of former Jim Crockett Promotions personnel.

Deceased individuals are indicated with a dagger (†).

Wrestlers

Notes

Other on-air personnel
 Gary Michael Cappetta (as a ring announcer)
 David Penzer (as a ring announcer)
 Michael Buffer (as a main event ring announcer)
 Chris Cruise (as a commentator)
 Doug Dellinger (born Howard Douglas Dellinger) (as head of security)
 Kip Allen Frey (as a Vice-President)
 Greg Gagne (as a road agent)
 Mike Graham (Mike Gossett) † (as a road agent)
 Slick Johnson (Mark Johnson) (as a referee)
 Rocky King (William Boulware, Jr.) † (as a referee)
 Craig Leathers (as a producer)
 Theodore Long (as a manager)
 Mark Madden (as a commentator)
 Lee Marshall † (as a commentator/interviewer)
 Pamela Paulshock (as an interviewer and valet)
 Dr. Harvey Schiller (as TBS executive)
 Tony Schiavone (as a commentator)
 Billy Silverman (as a referee)
 Mr. T (Lawrence Tero) (as a referee)
 Mike Tenay (as a commentator)
 Sir William (William Crookshanks) (as a manager)

References

External links

World Championship Wrestling alumni